Brace the Wave is the third solo studio album from Sebadoh and Folk Implosion frontman Lou Barlow. It was released in September 2015. All instruments were played by Barlow.

Track listing

Personnel
Lou Barlow – Everything
Justin Pizzoferrato - Producer and Engineer

References

2015 albums
Lou Barlow albums